The Canadian women's national under-18 ice hockey team is the national under-18 ice hockey team for women in Canada. The team represents Canada at the International Ice Hockey Federation's IIHF World Women's U18 Championships.

World Women's U18 Championship record

*Includes one loss in extra time (in the playoff round)
^Includes one win in extra time (in the preliminary or playoff rounds)
**Includes two losses in extra time (in the preliminary or playoff round)
^^Includes two wins in extra time (in the preliminary round or playoff rounds)

Awards and honours
2008 IIHF World Women's U18 Championship Directorate Award, Best Defenceman:  Lauriane Rougeau
2008 IIHF World Women's U18 Championship Directorate Award, Best Forward:  Marie-Philip Poulin
2010 IIHF World Women's U18 Championship Directorate Award, Most Valuable Player:  Jessica Campbell
2010 IIHF World Women's U18 Championship Directorate Award, Best Defenceman:  Brigette Lacquette
Jessica Campbell, Leading scorer, 2010 IIHF World Women's U18 championship

Current roster
Roster for the 2023 IIHF World Women's U18 Championship.

Head coach: Courtney Birchard Kessel

References

External links
 Canadian women national team Under-18 pages in Canada Hockey Website

See also
 IIHF World Women's U18 Championships
 2008 IIHF World Women's U18 Championship
 2009 IIHF World Women's U18 Championship
 2010 IIHF World Women's U18 Championship
 2011 IIHF World Women's U18 Championship
 2012 IIHF World Women's U18 Championship

Women's national under-18 ice hockey teams
Youth ice hockey in Canada
Ice